Robert Paul Kroetsch  (June 26, 1927 – June 21, 2011) was a Canadian novelist, poet and nonfiction writer. In his fiction and critical essays, as well as in the journal he co-founded, boundary 2, he was an influential figure in Canada in introducing ideas about postmodernism.

He was born in Heisler, Alberta. He began his academic career at Binghamton University (State University of New York); after returning to Canada in the mid-1970s he taught at the University of Manitoba in Winnipeg. Kroetsch spent several years in Victoria, British Columbia, before returning to Winnipeg, then to retirement in Alberta, where he continued to write. In 2004 he was made an Officer of the Order of Canada.

Bibliography 

Novels
 But We Are Exiles – 1965
 The Words of My Roaring – 1966
 The Studhorse Man – 1969 (winner of the 1969 Governor General's Award for Fiction)
 Gone Indian – 1973
 Badlands – 1975
 What the Crow Said – 1978
 Alibi – 1983
 The Puppeteer – 1992
 The Man from the Creeks – 1998
 (in German) transl. Martina Tichy: Klondike. Die Ballade von Lou und Dangerous Dan McGrew. Schneekluth, Munich 2005

Poetry
 The Stone Hammer Poems – 1975
 The Ledger – 1975
 Seed Catalogue – 1977
 The Sad Phoenician – 1979
 The Criminal Intensities of Love as Paradise – 1981
 Field Notes: Collected Poems – 1981
 Advice to My Friends – 1985
 Excerpts from the Real Worlds: A Prose Poem in Ten Parts – 1986
 Completed Field Notes: The Long Poems of Robert Kroetsch – 1989
 The Hornbooks of Rita K – 2001 (nominated for a Governor General's Award)
 The Snowbird Poems – 2004
 Too Bad: Sketches Toward a Self-Portrait – 2010
 I'm Getting Old Now- unknown

Other
 Alberta – 1968
 The Crow Journals – 1980
 Labyrinths of Voice: Conversations with Robert Kroetsch – 1982
 Letter to Salonika – 1983
 The Lovely Treachery of Words: Essays Selected and New – 1989
 A Likely Story: The Writing Life – 1995
 Abundance: The Mackie House Conversations about the Writing Life – 2007 (with John Lent)

See also 

 Canadian literature
 Canadian poetry
 List of Canadian poets

Further reading 
 Simona Bertacco: Out of place. The writings of Robert Kroetsch. Peter Lang, Berne 2002
 Francis Zichy: Disenchanted Modernity in Robert Kroetsch's "The Studhorse Man." Biology and Culture; Sex and Gender; Eugenics and Contraception; Writing and Reading. Peter Lang, New York 2011
 Fiona McMahon: Robert Kroetsch and archival culture in the Canadian long poem, in Études canadiennes. Revue interdisciplinaire en France, 74, 2013, p. 73–85 en ligne

References

External links 
 Robert Kroetsch Biography
 Robert Kroetsch fonds (papers) at Archives and Special Collections, University of Calgary
 Complete list of literature (primary, secondary), University of Manitoba, 1965–2004
 Kroetsch's item at Athabasca University, further links, e.g. to an interview with him

1927 births
2011 deaths
20th-century Canadian poets
20th-century Canadian male writers
Canadian male poets
Canadian male novelists
Officers of the Order of Canada
Governor General's Award-winning fiction writers
Writers from Winnipeg
Writers from Alberta
Road incident deaths in Canada
20th-century Canadian novelists
Binghamton University faculty